Lingal is a mandal in Nagarkurnool district, Telangana, India.

Geography

Institutions
 Andhra Pradesh Social Welfare Residential School
 Netaji Vidyaniketan Upper Primary School
 Zilla Parishad High School

Villages
The villages in Lingal mandal include:
 Ambatpally 	
 Appaipally 	
 Ausalikunta 	
 Chennampally 	
 Dhararam 	
 Jeelugupally 	
 Komatikunta 	
 Kothakuntapally
 Lingal 	
 Rayavaram 	
 Shainpet 	
 Surapur 	
 Vallabhapur
 Rampur
 Bakaram
 Manajipet

References

Mandals in Mahbubnagar district